The Last Voyage of Henry Hudson is an oil on canvas painting by English artist John Collier, created in 1881.  It is part of the Tate Britain collections since 1881.

History and description
The painting depicts the historical event that happened during English navigator Henry Hudson final voyage to search for the Northwest passage, when his crew mutinied in Hudson Bay, and he, his son and others were abandoned in a small boat, on 23 June 1611. It is unknown what happened to Hudson, his son and his men, after this but its presumed that they eventually died of cold or starvation.

Collier depicts Hudson, dressed in black and with a grey beard, at the rudder of his ship, staring eerily, while holding the hand of his son, who is at his feet. To the left, a mustached man with a vague gaze covers himself with a fur blanket. The vast, desolated Arctic landscape, with an iceberg and a snow covered mountain visible, to the left, hint to the inclement cold weather and serves as the background to the human drama that has unfolded. The painting drew the attention of his contemporary viewers to the ongoing Arctic explorations in the 19th century, including another attempts to find the Northwest passage.

References

Further reading
 Gleason, Carrie. Henry Hudson, Seeking the Northwest Passage, Crabtree Press, 2005, page 2, ISBN 9780778724087
 Pollock, Walter Herries. The Art of the Hon. John Collier, Virtue and Company, University of Minnesota Press, 1914, page 24

1881 paintings
Paintings by John Collier
History paintings
Collection of the Tate galleries
Maritime paintings